Coleotechnites condignella is a moth of the family Gelechiidae. It is found in North America, where it has been recorded from California, Arizona, South Carolina and Florida.

The wingspan is 13–15 mm. The forewings are white, thickly mottled with black and with a conspicuous deep black longitudinal streak from the base of the costa through the middle of the wing nearly to the apex, partly edged with white scales. There is a thin, faint arrow-shaped transverse white fascia, pointing toward the apex at the apical fourth and a short black dash on the middle of the wing between the costal edge and the central longitudinal black streak. There are three groups of raised scales, predominantly black, on the dorsal part of the wing below the central black streak. The hindwings are light fuscous, in males with a long ochreous yellow tuft of dilated hairs on the base of the dorsum.

The larvae feed on Pinus ponderosa.

References

Moths described in 1929
Coleotechnites